Juana is a Spanish female first name. It is the feminine form of Juan (English John), and thus corresponds to the English names Jane, Janet, Jean, Joan, and Joanna.  Juanita is a common variant. The name Juana may refer to:

People
Juana I (1479–1555), Queen of Castile and Aragon
Juana Rosa Aguirre (1877–1963), Chilean first lady
Juana Azurduy de Padilla (1780–1862), South American military leader
Juana Barraza (born 1957), Mexican serial killer
Juana Belén Gutiérrez de Mendoza (1875–1942), Mexican writer
Juana Bormann (1893–1945), German war criminal
Juana Briones de Miranda (1802–1889), American landowner
Juana Castro (born 1933), Cuban exile
Juana de Ibarbourou (1892–1979), Uruguayan poet
Juana Enriquez (1425–1468), Queen of Aragon
Juana Inés de la Cruz (1651–1695), Mexican scholar
Juana Teresa Juega López (1885-1979), Galician-language Spanish poet
Juana Lumerman (1905–1982), Argentine artist 
Juana Manuel (1339–1381), Queen of Castile 
Juana Manuela Gorriti (1818–1892), Argentine writer 
Juana María de los Dolores de León Smith (1798–1872), Spanish noblewoman
Juana Maria (1811–1853), Native American castaway
Juana Molina (born 1961), Argentine singer-songwriter
Juana Romani (1869–1924), Italian painter
Juana Ross Edwards (1830-1913), Chilean philanthropist
Juana de J. Sarmiento (1899-1979), Colombian politician, activist
Juana Saviñón (born 1980), Dominican volleyball player

See also
Juanita (disambiguation)

Spanish feminine given names
it:Juana